Ptolemy, king of Epirus (237 BC – 234 ВС) was the second son of Alexander II, king of Epirus, and Olympias, grandson of the great Pyrrhus and brother of Phthia of Macedon. He was named in honour of his late uncle Ptolemy. He succeeded to the throne on the death of his elder brother, Pyrrhus II of Epirus, but reigned only a very short time, having set out on a military expedition, during the course of which he fell sick and died or, according to Polyaenus, he was treasonably assassinated. The date of his reign cannot be fixed with certainty, but as he was a contemporary of Demetrius II, king of Macedonia, it may be placed between 239 and 229 BC. He was succeeded by Deidamia II or Pyrrhus III.

References
Smith, William (editor); Dictionary of Greek and Roman Biography and Mythology, "Ptolemaeus", Boston, (1867)

Notes

Rulers of Ancient Epirus
3rd-century BC Greek people
Year of birth unknown
230s BC deaths